Montrose  Township may refer to:

 Montrose Township, Ashley County, Arkansas, in Ashley County, Arkansas
 Montrose Township, Lee County, Iowa
 Montrose Charter Township, Michigan
 Montrose Township, Cavalier County, North Dakota, in Cavalier County, North Dakota
 Montrose Township, McCook County, South Dakota, in McCook County, South Dakota

Township name disambiguation pages